is Mika Nakashima's 15th single. It is a re-cut single, originally from her Music album, and was used as the theme song for the PlayStation 2 game Drakengard 2. "Hitori (single ver.)" is the theme song for the game while "Hitori (Endroll ver.)" is the version heard during the credits. It was released a week ahead of the game. Overall, it sold 26,275 copies according to the Oricon charts.

Track list
 Hitori (single ver.) (ひとり; Alone)
 Hitori (album ver.)
 Hitori (endroll ver.)
 Hitori (instrumental)

Charts

Oricon Sales Chart

References

2005 singles
Mika Nakashima songs
2005 songs